Basketball at the 1985 Games of the Small States of Europe was held in 1985 in San Marino.

Medal summary

Men's tournament
Men's tournament was played by a round-robin group composed by four teams.

Table

External links
Results at the Cypriot Olympic Committee website
Malta basketball team at the GSSE

Small
1985 Games of the Small States of Europe
1985
International basketball competitions hosted by San Marino